Mark Pirie (born 30 April 1974) is a New Zealand poet, writer, literary critic, anthologist, publisher, and editor. He is best known for his Generation X New Zealand anthology The NeXt Wave, which included an 8,000-word introduction (1998), the literary journals JAAM (Just Another Art Movement) and broadsheet, a book cover photo series of tributes to famous rock albums, and the small press HeadworX Publishers in Wellington, New Zealand.

Life 

His thesis was on the New Zealand poet and editor Louis Johnson, a writer who shares similarities with Pirie's work.

Publications 

Pirie has written or published over 100 titles listed in the National Library of New Zealand. Many are published under his own imprints HeadworX Publishers and The Night Press, Wellington or through the Earl of Seacliff Art Workshop in Paekākāriki.

The main influences on his literary development were listening to popular music, blues and jazz at an early age. His poetry draws on film, music and pop culture elements.

Pirie's own published works include numerous collections or anthologies of poetry (one of them being a hand-made book The Bet: Poems in Memory of Jim Morrison - American Poet) and a novel in verse, TOM (2009).

In 2003, his selected poems, Gallery, was commissioned by Australian poet John Kinsella and published in England by Salt Publishing.

In 2008, he was included in the anthology New New Zealand Poets in Performance.

Publications by Mark Pirie 

A selection of Mark Pirie’s books

Anthologies

New Zealand Writing: The NeXt Wave, University of Otago Press, Dunedin, New Zealand, 1998.
Voyagers: Science Fiction Poetry from New Zealand, with Tim Jones, IP, Brisbane, Australia, 2009.
The Earl is in…: 25 Years of the Earl of Seacliff, Earl of Seacliff Art Workshop, Paekakariki, New Zealand, 2009.
Rail Poems of New Zealand Aotearoa, Poetry Archive of New Zealand Aotearoa, Wellington, New Zealand, 2010
'A Tingling Catch': A Century of New Zealand Cricket Poems 1864-2009, HeadworX, Wellington, New Zealand, 2010.

Poetry

Shoot, Sudden Valley Press, Christchurch, New Zealand, 1999.
No Joke, Sudden Valley Press, Christchurch, New Zealand, 2001.
The Blues, Earl of Seacliff Art Workshop, Paekakariki, New Zealand, 2001.
Dumber: Poems, Earl of Seacliff Art Workshop, Paekakariki, New Zealand, 2003.
Gallery: A Selection, Salt Publishing, Cambridge, UK, 2003.
Poems for Poets: Dedications and Elegies, Earl of Seacliff Art Workshop, Paekakariki, New Zealand, 2004.
London Notebook, Earl of Seacliff Art Workshop, Paekakariki, New Zealand, 2005.
Sounds of Sonnets, with Michael O'Leary, HeadworX Publishers, Wellington, New Zealand, 2006.
TOM: A Novel in Verse, Poets Group, Christchurch, New Zealand, 2009.

Fiction

Swing and Other Stories, Earl of Seacliff Art Workshop, Paekakariki, New Zealand, 2002.

References

External links 

 Mark Pirie's personal website 
 New Zealand Book Council Profile 
 HeadworX Publishers website 
 Poetry Archive of New Zealand Aotearoa 
 Mark Pirie's full bibliography 

For a complete listing of Mark Pirie's works, see the online catalogue of the National Library of New Zealand 

1974 births
New Zealand poets
New Zealand male poets
New Zealand literary critics
Victoria University of Wellington alumni
University of Otago alumni
Living people
New Zealand publishers (people)
People from Wellington City